Chionodes mongolica is a moth of the family Gelechiidae. It is found in Ukraine, Russia (southern Ural, Tuva, Irkutsk Oblast, Transbaikal), North Korea, China (Jilin) and Mongolia.

References

Moths described in 1979
Chionodes
Moths of Europe
Moths of Asia